Yullundry is a rural locality between the towns of Yeoval and Cumnock in the Central West region of New South Wales, Australia.

History
The locality once had a shop—owned by J Ryan—a school and a railway station on the now closed Molong–Dubbo railway line. None of these establishments now exist; any remnants were destroyed in a fire during the late 1970s. The Yullundry church still exists and is still attended.
Yullundry Post Office opened on 1 March 1873 and was closed before the end of 1887.

References

Towns in the Central West (New South Wales)
Cabonne Council